Oriastrum is a genus of plants in the sunflower family, found only in the Republic of Chile in South America.

Species

 Oriastrum albicaule Phil.
 Oriastrum apiculatum (J. Rémy) A.M.R. Davies
 Oriastrum stuebelii (Hieron.) A.M.R. Davies

References 

Asteraceae genera
Endemic flora of Chile
Taxa named by Eduard Friedrich Poeppig